Siecie  (German: Zietzen) is a village in the administrative district of Gmina Smołdzino, within Słupsk County, Pomeranian Voivodeship, in northern Poland. In 2011, the total population of the village was 136.

Before 1648 the area was part of Duchy of Pomerania, 1648–1945 Prussia and Germany. For the history of the region, see History of Pomerania.

References

Siecie